John Greif II Airport  is an airport that serves San Pedro and Ambergris Caye, Belize. It was renamed from San Pedro Airport to John Greif II Airport in 2010.

Airlines and destinations

See also
Transport in Belize
List of airports in Belize

References

External links
OurAirports - San Pedro
FallingRain - San Pedro Airport

Airports in Belize
Belize District